Damp usually refers to the word moist. It may also refer to:

Music 

Damp (Norwegian band), a Norwegian band
 Damp (album), a 2006 a compilation album by experimental/industrial band Foetus

Science and technology 

DAMP Project, a ballistic missiles research program
DAMP (software bundle), a solution stack of software used to run dynamic Web sites
4-DAMP (1,1-dimethyl-4-diphenylacetoxypiperidinium iodide), a muscarinic acetylcholine receptor antagonist
 Deficits in Attention, Motor control and Perception, a psychiatric concept
Deoxyadenosine monophosphate, or dAMP, a nucleic acid
Digital AMPS, or D-AMPS, second-generation mobile phone systems
 Hitachi Disk Array Management Program, a software for managing disk storage array
Damage-associated molecular pattern, a part of the immune system

Other uses 
 Damp (structural), the presence of unwanted moisture in the structure of a building
 Damp (mining), a gaseous product formed in coal mines, pits, etc.
 Damp, Germany, a municipality in Schleswig-Holstein, Germany
 Developmentally Appropriate Musical Practice, a practice in music education

See also
 Damper (disambiguation)
 Damping (disambiguation)